Under the Rules and Regulations of Tennis, when a player violates a rule or does not follow the tennis code of conduct, the umpire or tournament official can issue one of the following (Section IV, Article C, Item 18 – "Unsportsmanlike Conduct"):
 "Point Penalty"
 "Suspension Point"

Generally, this results in the following escalation:
 First offense: Warning
 Second offense: Loss of a point
 Third (and each subsequent) offense: Loss of a game
After the third offense, it is up to the chair umpire or tournament director whether this constitutes a Default/Disqualification.

This is outside of any "off-court" issues related to a player's attire, behavior at media conferences, drug use, etc.

Selected period code violation summary
The New York Times compiled a list of fines received by gender between 1998 and 2018 at the four major tennis grand slam tournaments.

List of disqualifications
This is a list of code violations that resulted in a player or doubles team being disqualified from the tournament.

ATP Tour

WTA Tour

Other notable violations

References

Tennis